Mikak ( – October 1, 1795), also known as Micock, Mycock, or Mecock, was born in Labrador, Canada and died at Nain, Newfoundland and Labrador. She was one of several Inuit to travel to Europe in the 18th century and return to North America, although many Inuit who had travelled to Europe subsequently died from diseases, especially smallpox, before returning.

Mikak, daughter of Inuk chief Nerkingoak, was very influential in creating friendly relationships between traders from Europe and native Labradoreans. She was one of the first Inuit to appear in recorded history.

First European contacts 
In 1764 Jens Haven, a Moravian man of Danish ancestry, had recently returned to England from a mission trip to Greenland. While in Greenland, Haven was in constant contact with many Inuit in the area, and through them he learned to speak Inuktitut. In 1752, Jens Haven discovered that a missionary by the name of Dr. Johann Christian Erhardt had been murdered by a band of Inuit while trying to make contact with them on the coast of Labrador. The event of Dr. Erhardt's death was the catalyst behind Haven's decision to go to Labrador and preach the gospel to them, who he considered heathens in need of the salvation of Christ. After returning to Europe, Haven then received permission from the Moravian Brethren to go on a mission trip to Labrador in order to establish contact with the Labrador Inuit. After arriving on the British base of Chateau Bay on Belle Isle, the missionaries began their work preaching to the Inuit encampments that surrounded the area. One night while Haven was preaching, a bad storm began to roll in, stranding him and missionary Christian Larsen Drachardt, and forcing them to seek refuge for the night in the tent of an angakkuq (Inuit spiritual leader). Also present in the tent was a young woman by the name of Mikak, who was seen as a legend and heroine.
Mikak came in contact with the two Moravian missionaries Jens Haven and Christian Drachart (sometimes spelled Drachardt) in 1765.

Mikak embraced the Europeans from the start and memorized a prayer that Drachart had taught her. In 1767 she encountered the Europeans yet again but this time she and others were taken prisoner by Francis Lucas of the Royal Navy and his men of Fort York trading post in Chateau Bay, Labrador.

Capture/Fishing Station Raids 
In 1767 there was a raid at a fishing station that was owned by a man named Nicholas Darby. After a brief battle, Darby retreated and the Inuit stole several boats. Following the incident, a group of men from Fort York pursued the group, eventually killing the men and taking the women and children as prisoners. This would be Mikak's second contact with the Europeans, as she and her son had been with the group who attacked the fishing station. The prisoners were brought to Chateau Bay, where they were held over the winter. It was during this time as a prisoner that she began conversing with the second in command of the Garrison, Francis Lucas. He helped her learn English, which she picked up quickly, and in turn Lucas had Mikak teach him some words in Inuktitut, most likely for the purpose of easing future trade agreements between him and the Inuit.

Travel to England 
In 1768, Palliser ordered Francis Lucas to bring Mikak, her son Tutuak, and another older boy by the name of Karpik to be taken to England, where she learned to speak and write English fluently. The intention was to Show them how advanced and amazing European society was, with the hopes that upon their return they would be much more receptive and hospitable towards Europeans during trade agreements. While in England, Mikak met many members of the aristocracy and the royal family. The aristocrats of England treated her as a curiosity but were taken by her beauty and charm. John Russell painted her portrait while she wore extravagant dresses and jewelry given to her by Augusta, Dowager Princess of Wales. The portrait was exhibited at the Royal Academy of Arts, London but has since been moved to the Ethnological Institute at Göttingen University, Germany. Mikak grew very fond of the princess during her visit to England and they continued some type of a relationship for many years after Mikak's return to Labrador, sometimes even sending each other gifts. In 1769, partly because of Mikak insisting that the Moravians would be welcome in Labrador, the Moravians were given a land grant to establish a mission settlement in Labrador. Shortly after the Moravians were given the land grant, Mikak boards a boat and returns to Labrador with her son Tutuac, while Karpik stayed in England under the care of the Moravians.

Return 
Mikak and her son returned to Labrador in 1769 on a ship with Francis Lucas while Karpik stayed in England with the Moravians. Unfortunately Karpik died of smallpox shortly after Mikak and Tutuac left for Labrador. Mikak did not learn about Karpik's death until a year later. After her return, Mikak told her people stories of Europe and all of the wonderful things that happen there. The stories of the advanced technology available in England and large cities with stone buildings filled the Inuit with curiosity. She was a driving factor behind Inuit allowing the Moravians to establish a permanent settlement nearby. It was in 1770, a year after Mikak's return home, that the Moravians would finally arrive in Labrador to establish their mission settlement. Upon their arrival, they were greeted by Mikak who was wearing the dress that the Princess of Wales had previously given her as a show of diplomacy. With her during this meeting was her new husband Tuglavina, who she had married sometime during the previous year. The encounter went well, but the Moravians were skeptical and asked to be given proof that they would not be robbed or murdered by the Inuit during their stay in Labrador. Mikak was insulted, and maintained her position that the Moravians were welcome and would not be harmed. When the Moravians made a comment about the Inuit killing and stealing from the Europeans, Mikak replied by saying that the Europeans were known to kill and steal as well.

Establishment of Nain 
Mikak and Tuglavina agreed to guide the Moravians and help them find a good place to establish a settlement. During this trip, they made many stops to preach to the Inuit. Mikak organized all of these encounters and without her, the Moravians would not have been accepted nearly to the extent that they were. On August 4 of 1771, the Moravians were preparing to head back to England for the winter. Mikak gave them 5 fox pelts to bring to friends of hers in England. Two of the furs were for Augusta, the Dowager Princess of Wales, and two were for Governor Hugh Palliser. Haven agreed to take Mikak's gifts and deliver them for her. Tuglavina then helped guide the Moravians into open water before returning to Mikak, which he was anxious to do as he was worried that one of the other men from his camp might run off with her. In 1771 a group of 14 Moravians returned to Labrador permanently. They decided to build their settlement in a different location than the one that they had decided on a year prior because the original location would have put them further away from both reliable food sources and the Inuit camps. The Moravians at this time still relied on Mikak to help them maintain relationships with the Inuit. Before long the Moravians decided on a location for their mission. They then started building, and before long, they founded the town of Nain, Labrador. During the building of Nain, the relationship between Mikak and the Moravians became strained, partly because of her new husband Tuglavina and his rambunctious spirit.

Return to Traditional Ways 
After Mikak's falling out with the Moravians, her and her husband Tuglavina returned to living a traditional Inuit life. During the warmer months of the summer, they would travel in-land to Hunt migrating reindeer, then during the winter they would make their way to the coast in order to hunt seals, birds and whales. Traditional settlement patterns of the Inuit changed very much during this time period because the Inuit were attracted to the hunting grounds, but many of them also wanted to stay close to the mission in order to trade and be preached to by the Moravians. This was actually done intentionally by Hugh Palliser. Hugh Palliser was the Governor of Newfoundland at the time and he was in charge of ensuring that the fisheries on the southern coast became profitable. Originally, the fisheries were not turning a profit because of interference and stealing by the Inuit in the area. Palliser had the idea to establish the mission settlement in-land, with the hopes of drawing the Inuit further away from the fisheries on the coast. This was a mutually beneficial situation for Palliser and the Moravians because the fisheries began to turn a profit and the Moravians were given a land grant in order to preach to, and convert the Inuit. Up until 1773 Mikak had maintained some type of  civil relationship with the Moravians. In 1773 She returns to the Moravians and begins to tell them about how she had been mistreated by Tuglavina. Apparently her husband had stolen another man named Pualo's wife and ran off with her. This made the Moravians upset as it went against everything that they had  taught him, and they held Mikak equally responsible for Tuglavina's actions. It is not entirely known why, but  Mikak falls out of favour with the Moravians. Tuglavina however, managed to maintain a decent relationship with the Moravians. Mikak had become a candidate for baptism at the same time as Tuglavina, but she did not manage to be baptized until much later than him, despite returning to Nain several times with hopes of being baptized.

Separation From Tuglavina 
In 1774 Mikak returned to Nain with Tuglavina and her new son (not Tutuac). It is unclear if her second son is Tuglavina's child or not. Upon their return to Nain, both Tuglavina and Mikak wished to be converted to Christianity. Despite wishing to become Christian, Tuglavina left Mikak once again for the wife of a man named Pualo in 1774, and then again in 1775. Despite the Moravians deciding after each incident that they would have nothing more to do with Tuglavina, he would always return and the Moravians would accept him with somewhat open arms. After Mikak had been abandoned by Tuglavina three times, she decided she had had enough and formed a partnership with Pualo, the man whose wife had been stolen by Tuglavina. For the next several years Mikak and Pualo visited Nain occasionally, sometimes in the company of Tuglavina and the new family he had started. They lived a traditional lifestyle during these years, and lived off the land by hunting caribou during the warm months and hunting seals during the colder months.

Baptism of Mikak’s Family/Sled Rescue 
The next time we hear from Mikak is during the winter of 1779–1780. Mikak and the other families who she was with decided not to relocate for the winter because they had managed to build up a good supply of meat that could have lasted them the winter. unfortunately, wolves got in to their supply of food and the Inuit were left stranded with very little rations left to survive on. In late January an Inuk arrived at Nain and told them about the stranded families. The Moravians sent out two sleds to retrieve the families in the beginning of February, 1780. The following winter, Mikak and Pualo were determined to go to their normal hunting grounds, but were convinced by the Moravians to stay instead. Mikak stayed with the hopes that her entire family would be baptized as Christians. Pualo, as well as both of Mikak's sons, were baptized as Christians during that winter. For some reason that goes unexplained, Mikak is not baptized during that winter and is refused baptism once again. By February of the same year, Mikak and her family had decided to move away from Nain. this decision was most likely inspired by the Moravians refusal to baptize Mikak once again.

Trading Trips to the South 

After leaving Nain, Mikak decided to distance herself even further from the Moravians. She was a part of a group of Inuit who went south to trade with the Europeans in Chateau Bay. This was a direct act of defiance to the Moravians. The Moravians strongly discouraged the Inuit from going south, partly because they did not want to lose trade opportunities, but also because exposure to the Europeans could be dangerous for the Inuit as they had no immunity to European diseases like Smallpox. Mikak and her family returned to Nain briefly a year later. Upon arriving, Pualo asked the Moravians if they would baptize Mikak. Pualo told them that he believed it would help them during trade negotiations while in the south. This offended the Moravians, who were very clear about their feelings on the Inuit travelling south for trade. They rejected his request outright and Mikak and her family Promptly left Nain once again. In the summer of 1783 Mikak and her family left for chateau bay with a group of 180 Inuit against the wishes of the Moravians. Many Inuit died during this trip, either from diseases acquired while trading, infection or murder. Mikak's second husband Pualo was one of the men that died during this time period, most likely from some type of infection.

Final Years/Death 
Not much was recorded about Mikak's Final years. It is widely assumed that she spent most of the last years of her life continuing to travel south to trade near Chateau Bay. Mikak returned to Nain one last time in late September 1795 and was in very poor health. Barely able to speak, she expressed her desire to be baptised as a Christian before her death. The Moravians finally agreed to baptise Mikak. On the first day of October, 1795, Mikak died while under the care of the Moravian missionaries in Nain, Labrador and was buried at the Nain cemetery.

References

Notes

External links 

 
 Them Days Labrador Heritage
 Labrador Mission 100 years
 Famous Canadian Women
 Nain

Inuit from Newfoundland and Labrador
1740s births
1795 deaths
People from Labrador
Newfoundland Colony people
Persons of National Historic Significance (Canada)